The 2017–18 Telekom S-League is the 14th season of the Telekom S-League in the Solomon Islands. All matches are played at the hillside ground called Lawson Tama Stadium, with an approximate capacity of 20,000.

League table

TSL Championship

Quarter-finals

First legs
[Mar 10]

Solomon Warriors  5-0 Real Kakamora     

Marist            2-0 Guadalcanal       

[Mar 11]

KOSSA             2-2 Western United    

Henderson Eels    0-4 Malaita Kingz

Second legs
[Mar 17]

Malaita Kingz     2-1 Henderson Eels    

Western United    3-3 KOSSA             [KOSSA on away goal rule]

[Mar 18]

Guadalcanal       0-5 Marist            

Real Kakamora     1-4 Solomon Warriors

Semi-finals
[Mar 21]

Solomon Warriors  4-2 KOSSA             

[Mar 22]

Marist            1-0 Malaita Kingz

Third place match
[Mar 28]

KOSSA             0-2 Malaita Kingz

Grand final
[Mar 29]

Solomon Warriors  3-1 Marist

References

Solomon Islands S-League seasons
Solomon Islands
Football
Solomon Islands
Football